KSQX (89.1 FM) is a radio station licensed to Springtown, Texas, broadcasting a Christian radio format. It serves the area around where Tarrant, Parker, and Wise counties meet.

References

External links

 DFW Radio/TV History

SQX
SQX
1985 establishments in Texas
Three Angels Broadcasting Network radio stations